was a town located in Yazu District, Tottori Prefecture, Japan.

As of 2003, the town had an estimated population of 10,163 and a density of 118.82 persons per km². The total area was 85.53 km².

On March 31, 2005, Kōge, along with the towns of Funaoka and Hattō (all from Yazu District), was merged to create the town of Yazu.

References

External links
Yazu official website 

Dissolved municipalities of Tottori Prefecture
Yazu, Tottori